Ron Ray (born c. 1934) was a Canadian football player who played for the Hamilton Tiger-Cats. He won the Grey Cup with them in 1963. He played college football at Howard Payne University in Brownwood, Texas. After his retirement in 1964, he moved to Detroit, Michigan where he owned a furniture business.

References

1930s births
Living people
American football tackles
Canadian football tackles
Howard Payne Yellow Jackets football players
Hamilton Tiger-Cats players